Frank Norman Wilson (19 November 189011 September 1952) was an American cardiologist known primarily for his contributions to electrocardiography.

Early life
He was the only child of Norman Orlando Wilson, a farmer, and Mary Holtz Wilson. He studied at the University of Michigan in Ann Arbor, first graduating with a bachelor of Science degree in 1911, later graduating with a medical degree in 1913 from the same university.

Medicine
“Our modern understanding of the electrocardiogram comes, in large part, from the lifelong research and teaching of Frank Norman Wilson. In his prime, Wilson dominated used of the electrocardiogram as only two men, Thomas Lewis and Willem Einthoven.

Dr. Wilson's outstanding work was paid tribute during the year of his 60th birthday well before his death.  The July 1950 edition of the American Heart Association (Circulation) was dedicated to Dr. Wilson.  He also received the Gold Heart Medal of the American Heart Association at the time of their annual meeting in 1951.

Few investigators have done more to provide a firm foundation in a field of scientific endeavor than did Dr. Wilson in the field of electrocardiography.   All of his work in this domain was done primarily
in an effort to explain why certain changes appear in electrocardiograms under particular circumstances, and never was he satisfied with the purely descriptive approach that had been used so often in electrocardiographic 
research.  Although some of his work, particularly early studies, were concerned with the cardiac arrhythmias and other allied subjects, much of his research was devoted to study of the ventricular complex, and his contributions in connection with bundle branch block, myocardial infarction, ventricular hypertrophy and abnormalities of the T waves that provide the basis for much of our current knowledge of these conditions. His long familiarity with bio-electric phenomena, his keen and inquiring mind and his ability to use mathematics enabled him to devise the central terminal arrangement and one of the most ingenious and basic conceptions in the field of electrocardiography, the ventricular gradient.

Important though Dr. Wilson's papers and tangible contributions have been, his influence as a teacher and as an exponent of the interpretation of electrocardiograms has been of lasting value. His profound knowledge of the electrical phenomena underlying the electrocardiogram made him acutely aware of the many things apart from heart disease that may alter the records, and he often commented that the more a physician knows about electrocardiography the more conservative his interpretation of the records will be.

Much of Dr. Wilson's time in the last years of his active service was devoted to informal teaching of electrocardiography to doctors who came from all over the world to study in Ann Arbor under him. Many of the physicians who studied at the Heart Station would go on t occupy teaching posts in this country or abroad, and all of them regarded Dr. Wilson with a respect that is close to reverence. His work was extremely influential in the ongoing research of Dr. Robert H. Bayley at the University of Oklahoma towards the understanding of the biophysical principles of electrocardiology.

Dr Wilson was blessed with the finest of minds and an amazing ability to reduce difficult problems to their fundamentals.  He possessed a great power of concentration which frequently made him quite oblivious of his surroundings, and a dogged persistence which kept him at work until tasks were completed.  And yet he was intensely human and quite devoid of pomp or pretense. He always made time to help others with their problems,
and, even in periods of discouragement during his long final illness, his advice and counsel were readily available and freely given.

Although Dr. Wilson's life was dedicated primarily to electrocardiography he had many other interests and hobbies. Both he and his wife loved the country and for over 20 years spent more and more of their time on their
simple farm near Stockbridge. Here he enjoyed the study of birds and bird photography which developed into his familiarity with optical equipment leading to a profound interest in astronomy.

Dr. Wilson was the first person to describe Wolff-Parkinson-White Syndrome.

References 

1890 births
1952 deaths
American cardiologists
University of Michigan Medical School alumni